The COVID-19 pandemic in the Marshall Islands is part of the ongoing worldwide pandemic of coronavirus disease 2019 caused by severe acute respiratory syndrome coronavirus 2. The virus was confirmed to have reached the Marshall Islands on 28 October 2020, but remained confined to quarantined arrivals (no domestic community spread) until August 2022. The first known community transmission cases of COVID-19 were confirmed in Majuro on August 8, 2022, ending the country's COVID-free status. The first confirmed death from COVID-19 in the Marshall Islands occurred on August 11, 2022.

The Marshall Islands were the first country in the Pacific Islands to start its COVID-19 vaccination program, which commenced in December 2020.


Background 
On 12 January 2020, the World Health Organization (WHO) confirmed that a novel coronavirus was the cause of a respiratory illness in a cluster of people in Wuhan City, Hubei Province, China, which was reported to the WHO on 31 December 2019.

The case fatality ratio for COVID-19 has been much lower than SARS of 2003, but the transmission has been significantly greater, with a significant total death toll.

Timeline

The first cases in the country were reported on 28 October 2020, among two members of the US Army Garrison, who were among a group of 300 Marshall Islanders abroad being repatriated.

The two cases, a man and woman who arrived at a US airfield in Kwajalein tested negative for the virus in Hawaii a week before their arrival. The disaster committee of the Marshall Islands has said "there was no threat of community transmission" and that no lockdown would be implemented until further notice.

On 29 December 2020, the Marshall Islands became the first country in the Pacific to start its COVID-19 vaccinations. A group of high ranking leaders joined with Ministry of Health's doctors and nurses were the first to receive the United States government provided vaccines.

By 13 April 2021, the Marshall Islands reached an adult population vaccination rate of nearly 75% in the "main towns" with their first dose. After completing the urban areas, the Ministry of Health and Human Services planned to distribute Moderna and Johnson & Johnson vaccines to the most remote islands of the country to vaccinate the rest of the population. The 20,000 vaccine doses were provided as a donation by the United States and were deemed sufficient to cover every island's populations.

August 2022 saw the first outbreak of the virus in the Marshall Islands.

Statistics

New cases per day

Cases by islands

Notes

References

Marshall Islands
COVID-19 pandemic in Oceania
2020 in the Marshall Islands
2021 in the Marshall Islands